James Daniel Ross (28 March 1866 – 12 June 1902) was a Scottish footballer who played as an inside forward.

Born in Edinburgh, in the beginning of his career Ross played for Edinburgh's St Bernard's; he came to prominence as part of the Preston North End team known as "The Invincibles", who won the Football League during its first and second seasons, the first one being a double of the league and the FA Cup.

Nicknamed the "Little Demon", Ross's older brother Nick was also a footballer.

Career

Preston North End

Pre-League era (1883–1988) 
Jimmy Ross came south to Preston to join his famous elder brother Nick. His debut for Preston North End happened by chance  – he had to gone to Padiham on 24 November 1883 as a spectator to watch his brother play but, as the team were a couple of men short, he was invited to play. He scored two goals in North End's 4–0 win. Ross was a phenomenal goalscorer. In the four seasons up to the formation of the Football League in 1888, he scored over 250 goals in only 220 appearances, including in a Lancashire Senior Cup final.

Born in Edinburgh, he was unlucky not to have been chosen for his country as the Scottish Football Association selectors only chose from players at clubs north of the border at the time. Ross formed a highly successful partnership up front for North End with England international John Goodall. He scored seven goals against Hyde United in a 26–0 win and six against Reading when North End won 18–0. Jimmy Ross appeared in the 1888 FA Cup Final against West Bromwich Albion which Preston North End lost 2–1.

Football League debut (1988–1894) 
Ross made his League debut on 8 September 1888 as a forward for against Burnley at Preston North End's Deepdale ground. Preston won 5–2 and Ross scored the third and fourth goals. On 13 October 1888, in a League match at Deepdale against West Bromwich Albion, Ross scored in the 88th minute to put his team 3–0 up and became the first League player to score ten League goals.

Ross played in 21 of Preston's 22 League Championship matches and scored 19 goals, including four on 6 October 1888 at Deepdale against Stoke in a 7–0 win. He also scored two on four occasions: on 8 September 1888 at Deepdale against Burnley, on 29 September 1888 at County Ground in a 3–2 win against Derby County, in a 5–2 win at Pike's Lane over home team Bolton Wanderers and in a 5–0 win at Stoney Lane against home team West Bromwich Albion. Ross played in all five FA Cup ties for season 1888–89 and scored two goals including a goal in the Final at Kennington Oval on 30 March 1889 against Wolverhampton Wanderers; Preston North End won 3–0 to complete the first–ever League and FA Cup double.

Liverpool 
In 1894 Ross was signed for Liverpool by the club's manager John McKenna for £75. He made his debut for his new club in a Football League Division One match on 13 September 1894 and went on to score 12 times during the season, which ended with Liverpool being relegated. A prolific goalscorer in his time at Liverpool, Ross found the Second Division defences more to his liking managing to hit the net 23 times in 25 outings, spearheading the Reds charge back to the top tier. That season he came close to gaining international recognition when the SFA relaxed their rule on English players and he was selected for the first Home Scots v Anglo-Scots trial match; however no call-up to the full team resulted.

The following season Liverpool managed to establish themselves in the First Division, finishing 5th; he only scored twice in his 21 matches.

Burnley 
After his short spell at Anfield Ross was transferred out, signing for Second Division side Burnley in March 1897. There he scored 29 goals in 51 games. Just prior to his arrival, Burnley had been relegated and with Ross's help, they gained promotion back to the First Division in the 1898 test matches, ending with a 0–0 draw against Stoke, a scandal that ended test matches in English league football.

Manchester City 
Later that year Ross joined Manchester City, scoring 21 goals in 67 games there. Around the fin de siècle the Football league decided to impose a maximum wage of £4 per week for professional football players. For a full-time player like Ross, able to play for wages of up to £10 a week, this was serious threat to their livelihood. To curb this threat, Ross and other top players of the time formed the Association Footballers' Union. Ross was forced to retire from football due to ill health after the 1900–01 season. He died on 12 June 1902, aged 36.

Career statistics

Honours
Preston North End
 Football League: 1888–89, 1890–90
 FA Cup: 1888–89 runner-up: 1887–88

Liverpool
 Football League Second Division: 1895–96

Burnley
 Football League Second Division: 1897–98

Manchester City
 Football League Second Division: 1898–99

Professional baseball
In 1890 Jimmy, along with his brother, were recruited by Preston North End Baseball Club for the 1890 National League of Baseball of Great Britain, playing third base. Both brothers featured prominently for the reserve amateur team, who won the 1890 Amateur Championship Baseball Cup.

Notes

References

Scottish footballers
English Football League players
First Division/Premier League top scorers
St Bernard's F.C. players
Preston North End F.C. players
Liverpool F.C. players
Burnley F.C. players
Manchester City F.C. players
Footballers from Edinburgh
1866 births
1902 deaths
Association football inside forwards
FA Cup Final players
Scottish baseball players